Farlow or Farlowe is a surname. The surname derives from either Farlow or Fairley in Shropshire, England. Notable people with the surname include:

 Brian Farlow (born 1964), U.S. Virgin Islands swimmer
 Chris Farlowe (born 1940), English pop, soul, and R&B singer
 Jarred Farlow (born 1986), Australian rugby player
 Scott Farlow, Australian politician
 Stanley Farlow, American mathematician
 Tal Farlow (1921–1998), American jazz guitarist 
 Tessa King-Farlow (born 1941), British garden designer
 William Gilson Farlow (1844–1919), American botanist
 James O Farlow,  American paleontologist

In fiction
 Clayton Farlow, from the American TV series Dallas
 Evelyn Farlow, from the Australian TV soap opera Neighbours

References 

English-language surnames